Ivan Wardener (December 1, 1889 – July 15, 1930) was a track and field athlete who competed for Hungary in the 1912 Summer Olympics. He was born in Solivar-Prešov and died in Miskolc.

In 1912 he finished ninth in the high jump competition.

References

External links
Sports Reference
profile 

1889 births
1930 deaths
Sportspeople from Prešov
Male high jumpers from the Austro-Hungarian Empire
Athletes (track and field) at the 1912 Summer Olympics